Lance Milton (born March 4, 1987) is a former Canadian football defensive back who played two seasons in the Canadian Football League (CFL) for the Montreal Alouettes and Toronto Argonauts. He played college football for UBC and was selected in the 4th round (26th overall) of the 2012 CFL Draft.

Early life and education
Milton was born on March 4, 1987, in Calgary, Alberta. He attended Bishop McNally High School there before attending University of British Columbia.

Professional career
Following his graduation from college, Milton was selected in the 4th round (26th overall) of the 2012 CFL Draft by the Montreal Alouettes. He signed his rookie contract in May 2012. In his first season, Milton appeared in seven games at the cornerback position, making one tackle. He was released after one season, and later signed to the practice roster of the Toronto Argonauts. He was promoted for one game, making one tackle. He retired after the season.

References

External links
UBC profile

1987 births
Living people
UBC Thunderbirds football players
Players of Canadian football from Alberta
Montreal Alouettes players
Toronto Argonauts players
Canadian football defensive backs
Canadian football people from Calgary